The E-DA Theme Park is a theme park with Greek styling located in Dashu District, Kaohsiung, Taiwan. It claims to be south Taiwan's largest theme park.

Architecture
The theme park features the integration of Greek-style environment and pristine atmosphere.

Three main areas
Acropolis
Santorini
Trojan Castle

Transportation
The theme park is accessible by bus from Zuoying Station, Gangshan Station, Nanzi Station or Fengshan Station.

See also
 List of tourist attractions in Taiwan

References

External links

  

2010 establishments in Taiwan
Amusement parks in Kaohsiung
Amusement parks opened in 2010